Cenk Renda (born 10 October 1969, in Turkey) is a former Turkish professional basketball player. He played for Turkey national basketball team.

The former power forward is 2.05 m tall. Currently, he is team manager of Fenerbahçe under team coach Željko Obradović.

Career
 Efes Pilsen
 Fenerbahçe
 Oyak Renault (basketball)

External links
TBLStat.net Profile

1969 births
Living people
Turkish men's basketball players
Turkish basketball coaches
Fenerbahçe basketball coaches
Fenerbahçe men's basketball players
Anadolu Efes S.K. players
20th-century Turkish people
21st-century Turkish people